Ermengol (or Armengol) IV (1056–1092), called el de Gerb or Gerp, was the Count of Urgell from 1066 to his death. He was the son of Ermengol III and Adelaide, whose family is not known, even if some scholars made her daughter of Guillem I, Count of Besalu.

Ermengol inherited Urgell when he was only ten years old and ruled under the tutelage of the countess dowager, Sancha, third wife of his father, until he was twelve. During this brief minority, the nobility took the opportunity to plunder and occupy the comital demesne. It was not until 1075 that Ermengol was in control of his county and his nobles.

Ermengol was an active count. During his reign, Urgell profited economically collecting tribute from Lleida and Fraga. In 1076, having brought the nobles to submission, he began a Reconquista of his own, taking the basin of the river Sió with the villages of Agramunt and Almenar that year and Linyola and Belcaire in 1091. He conquered Calassanç and built a castle at Gerb, Spain, where he died, in an effort to pave the way to the recapture of Balaguer, which occurred during the reign of his son, Ermengol V, in 1102.

Ermengol was a firm supporter of the contemporary Gregorian reform of the Church, which he introduced to Urgel.

In 1077, Ermengol married Lucy, daughter of Artau I, Count of Pallars Sobirà, and granddaughter of Bernard I of La Marche. With her, he had his son and heir, the aforementioned Ermengol.

In 1079, he remarried to Adelaide of Forcalquier, daughter of William Bertrand of Provence. They had a son, William, who inherited Forcalquier, and a daughter who died young.

Notes

References

Sources

 
 
 

1056 births
1092 deaths
Counts of Urgell
11th-century Catalan people
11th-century Visigothic people